Imam Umaru of Salga (1858–1934) left a detailed account of Quranic education among the Hausa.

References

1858 births
1934 deaths
Hausa-language culture